August Nölck (né August Friedrich Robert Nölck; 9 January 1862 in Lübeck — 12 December 1928 in Dresden) was a prolific composer, virtuoso cellist, pianist, and music educator of the German School of Romanticism. He produced over 250 sheet music works, many of which have endured and are performed today. Nölck is well known for his cello repertoire.

Styles 
As professor of cello and piano, Nölck composed over three hundred works that included concertos, whims, waltzes, concertina, gavottes, minuets, mazurkas, funeral marches, and the like. However, due to the two World Wars in Germany and political divisions of the nineteenth and twentieth centuries, only his works produced in Venezuela have been recovered.

Nölck was part of the Dresden School of cello playing, which included Friedrich Wilhelm Grützmacher, who formed a foundation for the modern school of technique represented by Pablo Casals, Emanuel Feuermann, and others. Nölck's music reflects the Romantic styles of Brahms, Schumann, and Mendelssohn.

The conservatory was once located at 15 Wexstrasse on the ground floor and at another time, at grosse Theaterstrasse 44 in the home of the piano manufacturer, Otto Börs. While at the conservatory, Nölck became friends with a fellow student, Hugo Rüter (1859–1949), who went on to become a notable German composer.

There is limited biographical information on this composer.

Family 
August Nölck was born to the marriage of Johann Daniel Conrad Nölck and Maria Margaretha Bohnhoff. Nölck married Franziska Lewis, the first girlfriend of one of his close friends and conservatory classmate, Hugo Rüter.

Notes

External links 
 List of Nölck's works on IMSLP
 Nölck's works posted on IMSLP
 Recording Salon Music of August Nolck https://www.albanyrecords.com/mm5/merchant.mvc?Screen=PROD&Store_Code=AR&Product_Code=TROY1399&Category_Code=a-Instru

References

1862 births
1928 deaths
German classical cellists
German Romantic composers
Musicians from Lübeck
German male classical composers
19th-century German musicians
20th-century German male musicians
19th-century German male musicians
20th-century cellists